An early childhood professional is anyone who directly works with young children from infancy to age 8. Most often referred to as an early childhood teacher.

These professionals include:
Teachers
Daycare workers
Social workers
Educational assistants
Parent coordinators
Early childhood consultants
School administrators
Regional administrators
Coaches

Child care occupations
People who work with children
Professionals